Subimal Chandra Roy (1912-1971) was an Indian jurist, who served as a judge in the Supreme Court of India.

Early life and education
He was born on 29 May 1912. He was educated at the Presidency College, and the Scottish Church College, both within the University of Calcutta during 1928 and 1932. Thereafter he studied at the University College London (1932–35), and subsequently studied at the Lincoln's Inn (1936–37), from where he passed his Barrister-at-Law examination in January 1937.

Career
He started out by practising as an advocate of the Calcutta High Court from 1937 to June 1971. He was for many years, Senior Counsel, of the Government of India in the Calcutta High Court. He was one of the first three original side practitioners to be designated Senior Advocates under s.16(2) of the Advocates Act in 1968. For many years a trustee of the Deshbandhu Memorial Trust and many other Trusts. He served as Judge at the Supreme Court of India from 19 July 1971 to  12 November 1971. He was the second to be appointed as Judge of the Supreme Court of India directly from the Bar.

He died on 12 November 1971, though he had to attain retirement as Judge of the Supreme Court of India on 28.5.1977.

Awards
Buchanan, Prizeman 
Certificate of Honour by the Council of Legal Education
Langdon Medal

References

External links
 Bio-Official SC Website
 Official website
 "Supreme Court Rules, 1966"
 OpenJudis – Free Database of Supreme Court cases from 1950

1912 births
1971 deaths
Indian barristers
20th-century Indian judges
Justices of the Supreme Court of India
Members of the Inner Temple
Scottish Church College alumni
University of Calcutta alumni
Alumni of University College London
Members of Lincoln's Inn
20th-century Indian lawyers